Colonel Joseph Charles Rodríguez (November 14, 1928 – November 1, 2005) was a United States Army soldier who earned the Medal of Honor – the United States' highest military decoration for his actions near Munye-ri, Korea, during the Korean War.

Early years
Rodríguez, a Mexican-American born in San Bernardino, California, was raised in the town of San Bernardino, where he also received his primary and secondary education. In October 1950, Rodriguez was drafted into the United States Army and ordered to report for induction in his hometown.

He received his basic training at Camp Carson in Colorado.  There he was assigned to Company H, 2nd Battalion of the 196th Regimental Combat Team. Private Rodriguez completed his basic training in February 1951 and volunteered for duty in Korea. He was promoted to private first class (PFC) and sent overseas and assigned to Company F, 2nd Battalion, 17th Infantry Regiment, 7th Infantry Division.

Korean War
On May 21, 1951, Company F was assigned the mission of occupying some high ground near the village of Munye-ri during the UN May–June 1951 counteroffensive. The high ground was held by firmly entrenched enemy forces. Three times Company F attacked the ridge, and three times they were thrown back.

PFC Joseph C. Rodríguez was the assistant squad leader of the 2nd Platoon. His squad's advance was halted by enemy hostile fire coming from five different emplacements. Rodriguez then took it upon himself to destroy these emplacements.  He charged the emplacements and hurled grenades into each of the foxholes. Rodriguez destroyed the emplacements and killed 15 enemy soldiers. As a result, the enemy was routed and the strategic strongpoint secured.  Rodriguez was promoted to the rank of sergeant and nominated for the Medal of Honor.

On February 5, 1952, President Harry S. Truman bestowed upon Sergeant Rodríguez the Medal of Honor in a ceremony held in the Rose Garden in the White House. The citation reads:

Later years
After the Korean War, Rodríguez decided to make the military his career. He was assigned to the administrative staff at the ORC headquarters in San Bernardino.
 
On April 23, 1952, Rodríguez and his fiancée Miss Rose Aranda were the invited guests on You Bet Your Life, a 1950s television game show hosted by Groucho Marx.  The following is part of the conversation between Rodriguez and Marx in the show:

In 1953, Rodríguez married Rose and together they had three children. He subsequently became a commissioned officer in the US Army Corps of Engineers, serving more than 30 years in the military, through four Latin American assignments, and unaccompanied tours in Korea and Vietnam. In 1980, Rodriguez retired from the Army with the rank of colonel.

Rodríguez was residing with his wife, Rose, in El Paso, Texas, at the time of his retirement.  He spent the next ten years as Facilities Director at the University of Texas. He dedicated much of his time of his last fifteen years to national speech engagements addressing young people and soldiers, encouraging them to pursue their education.

Colonel Joseph C. Rodríguez died on November 1, 2005, in El Paso and was buried with full military honors at Mountain View Cemetery in San Bernardino, California.  Rodriguez is survived by his wife Rose; his sons, Lieutenant General Charles G. Rodriguez and Lawrence R. Rodriguez; daughter, Karen Sharp; 11 grandchildren; ten sisters and two brothers.

Awards and recognitions
Among Joseph C. Rodríguez's decorations and medals were the following:

See also

List of Medal of Honor recipients
List of Korean War Medal of Honor recipients
Hispanic Medal of Honor recipients

Notes

References

 
 
 
 
 

1928 births
2005 deaths
United States Army colonels
United States Army personnel of the Korean War
Korean War recipients of the Medal of Honor
United States Army Medal of Honor recipients
Recipients of the Legion of Merit
American people of Mexican descent
People from San Bernardino, California
Military personnel from California